Epicyrtica leucostigma is a moth of the family Erebidae first described by Turner in 1902. It is found in Australia.

References

Calpinae